The corporation of A. Schaaffhausen'scher Bank Association was a bank based in Cologne and was the first joint stock company legally recognised as a bank in Germany.

Company history
In 1791 Abraham Schaaffhausen founded his private bank, one of the first and most important financial resources for the growing Rhineland-Westphalia area and its involvement in heavy industry.  In 1848, the bank, seriously affected by the Revolutions of 1848, found itself facing solvency issues, and on March 29, 1848, they were forced to cease payment.  Under national guarantees, and acting upon the advice of the Prussian Finance Minister (and later founder of the Disconto-Association), David Hansemann, the bank was allowed to be salvaged by other bankers under the leadership of Gustav Mevissen, Wilhelm Ludwig Deichmann, Schaaffhausen's son-in law, and Victor Wendelstadt.  To this end, the Prussian government first sanctioned a bank in the form of a joint stock company - the A. Schaaffhausen'schen Bank Association. By 1852, the bank was able to pay back the aid it had received from the state.

Its banking philosophy may be inferred from an excerpt from the annual report for 1852 — “the function of a great banking institution is not so much to start new branches of industry . . ., as to induce the capitalists of the country, by recommendations based on exhaustive investigations, to turn idle capital toward such enterprises, which, when properly launched in response to existing requirements, and offering the guarantee of expert management, bid fair to yield reasonable profits.” Industrial in purpose, current account business was secondary, and deposits were received only on condition of three, six and 12 months' notice being given for their withdrawal, and then only at a low rate of interest. The close identification from the first with the prosperous and flourishing Rhineland-Westphalia industry, and the strict adherence to its original purpose, lent strength to the Bankverein to weather the financial crisis of 1857 without the necessity of canceling any of its outstanding credits — a strong factor in extending its influence during succeeding years. One after another it nurtured industrial enterprises within its banking zone, each becoming an added source of strength for the Bankverein.

In competition with both of the other big banks in the Rhineland, the Essener Credit-Institute and the  Bergisch-Märkischen Bank, the Bank Association was able to augment itself with branches in western Germany. In 1891 a branch was opened at Berlin — a branch in fact as well as name — the parent institution remaining the only one of the five German “great” banks having its headquarters outside of Berlin. In 1904 it was able to take over the Westdeutsche Bank (located in Bonn). Between 1904 and 1909 the Bank Association was involved in a joint venture with the Dresdner Bank. In 1908 the number of branches was 10, with one silent partnership, or “commandite,” and 15 deposit offices.

Six subsidiary banking companies were founded wholly or in part by the Bankverein (largely in co-operation with the Dresdner Bank), giving foreign banking and exchange facilities, a small incident in the general scheme of the Bankverein. Four German banks, with 13 branches, were absorbed wholly and another jointly with the Dresdner Bank. In addition, through ownership of shares, it maintained community of interest relations with three important banks, having 21 branches and numerous agencies, deposit offices and subsidiary connections. Most important, however, is the community of interest, mutual in terms, between the Dresdner Bank and the Bankverein, beginning 1 January 1904.

In 1908, it maintained representation on the boards of 94 other industrial and financial institutions. The capital of the Bankverein that year was 145,000,000 marks; and 34,157,125 marks surplus. The total capital power of the A. Schaaffhausen'scher Bankverein group was (1908) 278,538,001 marks, of which 231,000,000 marks constituted the capital, and 47,538,001 marks the surplus.  In 1913 the A. Schaaffhausen'sche Bank Association was the largest German regional bank.

In 1914 the Bank Association was taken over by the Disconto-Association, although it remained a stand-alone credit institute until 1929. Not until the fusion of the Disconto-Association with the Deutsche Bank in 1929 was the Bank Association completely merged with the Disconto-Association and then became a part of Deutsche Bank.

People Associated with the Bank
Well-known bankers of the Bank Association were:
 Gustav von Mevissen (Manager from 1848–1857)
 Karl Mathy (Director from 1854–1855)
 Carl Klönne (Manager from 1879–1900)
 Hermann Fischer (Manager from 1912–1919)

External links
  Company history from the site for the Institute of History of German Banks

References
 This article contains translations from the article on the German Wikipedia on December 7, 2005.
 

 
Banks established in 1848
1929 disestablishments in Germany
Defunct banks of Germany
Defunct companies of Germany
Companies based in Cologne
Companies of Prussia
Deutsche Bank
1848 establishments in Germany
Dresdner Bank